In the theory of quantum communication, the entanglement-assisted classical capacity of a quantum channel is the highest rate at which classical information can be transmitted from a sender to receiver when they share an unlimited amount of noiseless entanglement. It is given by the quantum mutual information of the channel, which is the input-output quantum mutual information maximized over all pure bipartite quantum states with one system transmitted through the channel. This formula is the natural generalization of Shannon's noisy channel coding theorem, in the sense that this formula is equal to the capacity, and there is no need to regularize it. An additional feature that it shares with Shannon's formula is that a noiseless classical or quantum feedback channel cannot increase the entanglement-assisted classical capacity. The entanglement-assisted classical capacity theorem is proved in two parts: the direct coding theorem and the converse theorem. The direct coding theorem demonstrates that the quantum mutual information of the channel is an achievable rate, by a random coding strategy that is effectively a noisy version of the super-dense coding protocol. The converse theorem demonstrates that this rate is optimal by making use of the strong subadditivity of quantum entropy.

See also 

 Classical capacity
 Quantum capacity
 Typical subspace

References

Christoph Adami and Nicolas J. Cerf. von Neumann capacity of noisy quantum channels. Physical Review A, 56(5):3470-3483, November 1997.
Charles H. Bennett, Peter W. Shor, John A. Smolin, and Ashish V. Thapliyal. Entanglement-assisted classical capacity of noisy quantum channels. Physical Review Letters, 83(15):3081-3084, October 1999.
Charles H. Bennett, Peter W. Shor, John A. Smolin, and Ashish V. Thapliyal. Entanglement-assisted capacity of a quantum channel and the reverse Shannon theorem. IEEE Transactions on Information Theory, 48:2637-2655, 2002.
Charles H. Bennett and Stephen J. Wiesner. Communication via one- and two-particle operators on Einstein-Podolsky-Rosen states. Physical Review Letters, 69(20):2881-2884, November 1992.
Garry Bowen. Quantum feedback channels. IEEE Transactions on  Information Theory, 50(10):2429-2434, October 2004. .

Quantum information science
Limits of computation